= Mummy GO =

Nigerian evangelist

- Born: Funmilayo Adebayo; 15 June 1967 (age 59); Ekiti State
- Occupation: Evangelist

Funmilayo Adebayo commonly known as Mummy GO is a Nigerian evangelist and founder of Rapture Proclaimer Evangelical Church of God from Ekiti State. Her controversial message 990 years in the Kingdom of Darkness went viral in Nigeria, and caught the attention of many people. There, she claimed she spent 990 years in the kingdom of darkness and narrated her experiences there and what led her to Christ.
